Champaran District was a district of British India.

In 1917, Mohandas Gandhi did his first Satyagraha movement in India at this district against European landowners and British government.

History
It was created in 1866. On 1 December 1971 it was split into two districts: Paschim Champaran and Purbi Champaran.

In 1917, Mohandas Gandhi lead a satyagraha movement in Champaran district against European landowners and government policies. During that time British landowners use to pressurize local peasants to grow indigo and sell it in lower prices. In response British government arrested Gandhi, later released and appointed him in an investigating committee. Later British government did amendments to improve peasant's situation. This was Gandhi's first movement in India, later he became the leader of Congress.

References

Former districts of Bihar
Districts of British India